Cathy Krier (born 17.January 1985) is a Luxembourg pianist. She started playing the piano at early age in the Conservatoire de Luxembourg. She has embarked on an international career, performing mainly in Europe (France, Germany, Italy, Austria, Spain and Luxembourg), United States and China.

Early life 

Cathy Krier was born in the city of Luxembourg and at the age of five attended the Conservatoire to study piano. Daughter of musicians, she started playing the violin when she was only three years old. In her studies, she has received guidance from Pavel Gililov, Robert D. Levin, Dominique Merlet, Homero Francesch and Andrea Lucchesini. She has studied at Académie musicale de Villecroze, Scuola di Musica di Fiesole and Hochschule für Musik und Tanz.

Performances 

Having performed at the opening Ceremony of Luxembourg European Capital of Culture, at the inauguration of Luxembourg Philharmonie as well as in many Festivals and venues around Europe and United States, (including the Ruhr Piano Festival, Echternach International, Musek am Syrdall Festival), she has played in venues such as the Kennedy Center Millennium Stage, Washington, D.C. and Rolduc Abbey in the Netherlands among many others. She has performed with various orchestras and ensembles, including the Luxembourg Philharmonic Orchestra and the European Soloists of Luxembourg as well as with the Latvian Philharmonic Chamber Orchestra. Cathy Krier has performed under various conductors including Jack Martin Händler, Garry Walker, Bramwell Tovey, Yoon K. Lee and Pierre Cao.

Awards 

In 2003, she awarded the Prix Norbert Stelmes by the Jeunesses Musicales du Luxembourg and the following year she received 
the IKB International Foundation Prize.

In May 2014, it was announced that Krier had become one of the European Concert Hall Organisation's "Rising Stars", providing her with opportunities to perform in the organisation's network of 21 concert halls.

Discography 

Her first solo recording features pieces by Scarlatti, Haydn, Chopin, Dutilleux and Müllenbach (released in 2008).
In June 2013, her second album called The Piano was released. It explores the piano works of Czech composer Leoš Janáček (1854 – 1928) 

 Études pour Piano, Gyorgy Ligeti (2021)

References

External links 
 

1985 births
Luxembourgian classical pianists
Women classical pianists
People from Luxembourg City
Living people
21st-century classical pianists